Tadhg Slattery is a Paralympic swimmer from South Africa competing mainly in category SB5 events. He has cerebral palsy and is deaf.

Slattery competed as part of the South African Paralympic swimming team at six Paralympic games. His first games in 1992 gave him his first Paralympic gold medal in the 100m breaststroke in a world record time, as well as finishing fourth in his heat in the 50m freestyle, eighth in the final of the 50m butterfly, seventh in his heat of both the 100m and 400m freestyle.  In the 1996 Summer Paralympics he finished second in the 100m breaststroke behind Kasper Engel of the Netherlands who set a new world record, he also competed in the 50m freestyle finishing 28th in the heats, 50m butterfly where he finished ninth in the heats just missing the final and finished fourth in the final of the 200m medley. At his third games in 2000 he again won silver in the 100m breaststroke behind Kasper and added a second in the 200m medley behind the new world record set by Sascha Kindred of Great Britain, as well as finishing seventh in the 50m butterfly.  Tadhg won gold again in 2004 Summer Paralympics in the 100m breaststroke, beating his old rival Kasper Engel he also competed in the 200m medley finishing sixth but could not make the final of the 50m butterfly.  His fifth games in 2008 led to his first bronze medal, in his favored 100m breaststroke and finished last in his heat in the 200m individual Medley. And his final sixth games in 2012 led to his fifth place. He is now retired from  international swimming. He is now a full-time swimming coach for disabled people in Johannesburg, South Africa.

References

External links
 

Paralympic swimmers of South Africa
Swimmers at the 1992 Summer Paralympics
Swimmers at the 1996 Summer Paralympics
Swimmers at the 2000 Summer Paralympics
Swimmers at the 2004 Summer Paralympics
Swimmers at the 2008 Summer Paralympics
Swimmers at the 2012 Summer Paralympics
Paralympic gold medalists for South Africa
Paralympic silver medalists for South Africa
Paralympic bronze medalists for South Africa
South African male swimmers
Living people
Medalists at the 1992 Summer Paralympics
Medalists at the 1996 Summer Paralympics
Medalists at the 2000 Summer Paralympics
Medalists at the 2004 Summer Paralympics
Medalists at the 2008 Summer Paralympics
Year of birth missing (living people)
Paralympic medalists in swimming
S7-classified Paralympic swimmers
Male breaststroke swimmers
20th-century South African people
21st-century South African people